is a railway station in the city of Nakano, Nagano, Japan, operated by the private railway operating company Nagano Electric Railway.

Lines
Shinshū-Nakano Station is a station on the Nagano Electric Railway Nagano Line and is 25.6 kilometers from the terminus of the line at Nagano Station.

Station layout
The station consists of one ground-level side platform and one island platform, serving three tracks, with an elevated station building. The station is staffed.

Platforms

Adjacent stations

History
The station opened on 26 March 1923.

Passenger statistics
In fiscal 2015, the station was used by an average of 1529 passengers daily (boarding passengers only).

Surrounding area
Nakano City Hall

See also
 List of railway stations in Japan

References

External links

 

Railway stations in Japan opened in 1923
Railway stations in Nagano Prefecture
Nagano Electric Railway
Nakano, Nagano